The 1985–86 I-Divisioona season was the 12th season of the I-Divisioona, the second level of Finnish ice hockey. 12 teams participated in the league, and KalPa Kuopio won the championship. KalPa Kuopio, TuToHockey, KooKoo, and HPK Hämeenlinna qualified for the promotion/relegation round of the SM-liiga.

Regular season

External links
 Season on hockeyarchives.info

I-Divisioona seasons
2
Fin